Louga Department is one of the 45 departments of Senegal, and one of the three which comprise the Louga Region.

The chief settlement is Louga, the only commune in the department.

The rural districts (communautés rurales) comprise:
Arrondissement of Coki:
 Coki
 Ndiagne
 Thiamène Cayor
 Pété Ouarack
 Guet Ardo
Arrondissement of Keur Momar Sarr:
 Keur Momar Sarr
 Nguer Malal
 Syer
 Gande
Arrondissement of Mbédiène:
 Mbédiène
 Niomré
 Nguidilé
 Kéle Gueye
Arrondissement of Sakal:
 Léona
 Ngueune Sarr
 Sakal

Historic sites

 Old Artillery Barracks, commune of Louga
 Louga Post
 Louga Railway Station
 Kadd Gui acacia tree, opposite Louga railway station
 Historic site of " Toundou Diéwol "
 Daara of Coki at Cooki

References

Departments of Senegal
Louga Region